Yarın Ağlayacağım is a 1986 Turkish drama film, directed by Halit Refiğ and starring Kadir İnanır, Yaprak Özdemiroğlu and Gül Erda.

References

External links
 

1986 films
Turkish drama films
1986 drama films
Films directed by Halit Refiğ